Vallavari  is a village in the Aranthangirevenue block of Pudukkottai district, Tamil Nadu, India.

Demographics 

As per the 2001 census, Vallavari had a total population of 1605 with 2088 males and 780 females. Out of the total population 825 people were literate.

References

Villages in Pudukkottai district